Lost Canadians are individuals who have believed themselves to be Canadian citizens or to be entitled to citizenship, but who are not/were not officially considered citizens due to particular and often obscure aspects or interpretations of Canadian nationality law. Although these individuals had strong, undeniable connections to Canada, they were either never actually Canadian citizens throughout their entire life, or else had Canadian citizenship and lost it unknowingly through certain provisions of the Citizenship Act.

Causes of loss/failure to acquire Canadian citizenship 
Types of persons who would not have acquired Canadian citizenship when it was created under the 1946 citizenship laws included the following:
 Someone born in another country who did not live in Canada on their 24th birthday
 A "war bride" who was never naturalized
 A war bride's child who was never naturalized
 An unregistered "border baby" – a person with Canadian parents who was born in the U.S. and not registered, commonly someone whose mother crossed into the U.S. to give birth in the closest hospital
 In certain circumstances, someone whose connection to Canada involved descent through a woman rather than a man
 Someone born out of wedlock
 A person born to a parent on military service outside Canada

Types of persons who lost their Canadian citizenship included the following (based on both the 1946 and 1977 Citizenship Acts): 
 A second-generation born-abroad Canadian who did not apply to retain citizenship by their 28th birthday
 Those whose father naturalized in another country while they were children
 A woman who married a non-Canadian before 1947
 A child of a woman who married a non-Canadian before 1947, regardless of whether that child was born or lived in Canada
 A Canadian who took citizenship of another country before 1977

In most cases, Lost Canadians were never aware that they were not citizens (or had lost their citizenship) until they applied for government pensions, attempted to receive healthcare or applied for passports.

Amended Citizenship Act passage in 2008
On May 29, 2007, Canadian Minister of Citizenship and Immigration Diane Finley (CPC) announced her proposal to amend the Citizenship Act. Under the proposal, anyone naturalized in Canada since 1947 would have citizenship even if they lost it under the 1947 Act. Also, anyone born since 1947 outside the country to a Canadian mother or father, in or out of wedlock, would have citizenship if they are the first generation born abroad. Appearing before the Standing Committee on Citizenship and Immigration, Finley asserted that as of May 24, 2007, there were only 285 cases of individuals in Canada whose citizenship status needed to be resolved. Under the proposed legislation, anyone born before 1947 to a Canadian citizen abroad would be dealt with on a case-by-case basis; such individuals would have to apply for a ministerial permit.

Bill C-37, which received Royal Assent on April 17, 2008, amended the Citizenship Act to give Canadian citizenship to those who lost or never had it due to certain provisions in existing and former legislation. The law came into effect on April 17, 2009, one year following Royal Assent.

People who were citizens when the law came into force did not lose citizenship as a result of these amendments. The law was made retroactive to the time of birth or loss of citizenship, and gave citizenship to the following categories of people:
People who became citizens when the first citizenship act took effect on January 1, 1947 (including people born in Canada prior to 1947 and war brides) and who then lost their citizenship;
Anyone who was born in Canada or had become a Canadian citizen on or after January 1, 1947, and had then lost citizenship; and
Anyone born abroad to a Canadian citizen mother on or after January 1, 1947, if not already a citizen, but only if they were the first generation born abroad.

The exceptions are those born in Canada to a foreign diplomat, those who renounced their citizenship with Canadian authorities, and those whose citizenship was revoked by the government because it was obtained by fraud.

Cases not resolved by the modified law
As of 2009, there are still some people who are sometimes referred to as Lost Canadians, including some children of war brides, children born out of wedlock during the Second World War, and Mennonites who have been refused citizenship by the Canadian government. As of 21 October 2009, there were currently 81 people who are asserted to be such cases, but this number is shrinking as the remaining people in this category die off. One person who died while waiting for citizenship (in February 2009) was Guy Valliere, a World War II veteran who had been publicly promised citizenship by Diane Finley.

Kasey Neal
Kasey Neal, aged two and a half as of 2010, was denied citizenship because her grandparent was a female Canadian rather than a male Canadian. Citizenship and Immigration Canada (CIC) claimed that she is not eligible because her parent was at first denied citizenship and then was later granted retroactive citizenship (which would seem to make her the daughter of a Canadian and thus ordinarily guarantee citizenship). The Supreme Court of Canada ruled in Benner v. Canada (1997) that children of female Canadians are legally guaranteed all rights and privileges that children of male Canadians receive; however, this court decision was not interpreted by the CIC in favour of her case for citizenship.  This denial of citizenship is being brought before judicial review and could lead to a class-action lawsuit if the Supreme Court's decision is ignored by CIC.

Priscilla Corrie
In September 2010, Priscilla Corrie (87), a "war bride", was denied a Canadian passport despite having received passports in the past and despite being on Old Age Pension and Canadian Pension Plan and having come to Canada when she was 20. Her passport was issued later that year, after the government was forced to act due to media coverage of the incident in the Vancouver Sun newspaper.

Sandra Burke
Sandra Burke came to Canada at six years of age with her Canadian father after her American mother died.

In 2010, Burke was 66 and was facing possible removal as well as losing old age benefits.

On December 21, 2010, in Mississauga, Ontario, Burke was finally able to take her oath of statehood, after a lengthy fight and support from her MP.

Jackie Scott
The daughter of a Canadian soldier and a British-born mother naturalized as a Canadian citizen in 1955, Jackie Scott was refused a citizenship card in 2005. She was born while her father was stationed in England during the war in 1945; her parents were unmarried at the time. In 2013, Jackie Scott took her case to the courts to seek judicial review of her exclusion.

Byrdie Funk
Funk was born in Mexico to Canadian parents and moved back to Canada with them when she was two months old. Since then, Canada has been her home and she holds no other citizenship. She and her parents were unaware of a law requiring people born overseas between 1977 and 1981 to parents also born abroad to apply to maintain their citizenship by the age of 28, and missed the deadline. The arcane rule was abolished in 2009, however the change was not retroactive.  Funk joined the "Lost Canadians" group as she worked through the bureaucracy to regain her citizenship, which she regained on July 1, 2017.

New "Lost Canadians"
Bill C-37, which attempted to address the original phenomenon, included a provision that Canadian citizens by birth who were born outside Canada could not pass citizenship to their children born outside the country. This in turn has led to the potential creation of a new group of "Lost Canadians", with one notable example being Rachel Chandler, born in China to a Libya-born son of Canadian parents and a Chinese woman. Because her parents' marriage was not recognized by China at the time of her birth, she was not granted citizenship by China, and because she was born after Bill C-37 took effect, her father could not pass on his Canadian citizenship to her. This apparently rendered her stateless (which is against the Convention on the Rights of the Child, of which Canada is a signatory). Chandler now holds an Irish passport. She was entitled to Irish citizenship through her Irish-born paternal grandfather.

John Nicolas Fortin-Rodriguez of Magog, Quebec, born in Mexico in 2011 to Patrick Fortin (himself born abroad, the son of a Canadian soldier posted to CFB Lahr in Cold War-era West Germany) and Lucero Rodriguez (an immigrant from Mexico to Canada), holds a Mexican passport with a Canadian visa but has been denied Canadian citizenship due to being second generation born abroad.

In addition, some people born abroad in the second and subsequent generations not entitled to citizenship under previous versions of the Citizenship Act remain excluded due to the wording of changes which were part of Bill C-24 (2014). This limitation does not apply to people born before 2009 in similar circumstances, whose ancestor was not regularized by C-24.

Notable "Lost Canadians"
One notable Lost Canadian was Robert Goulet. He had provided evidence to support a claim of citizenship, but he died before it was approved.

References

External links
 
 
 
 Lost Canadians F.A.Q

 
Canadian nationality law
Statelessness